Plastic Surgery is an album by the Huntingtons released in 2000 on Tooth & Nail Records.

Track listing
All songs written by Huntingtons.

 "I Wanna Be A Ramone" - 2:30
 "American War Machine" - 2:45
 "Heartbreak At The Hardy Holly"  - 3:00
 "I Would Give You Anything" - 3:32
 "Tell Me Goodnight" - 2:11
 "Moral Threat" - 1:37
 "Growing Up Is No Fun" - 3:11
 "I'll See You Tonite" - 3:43
 "Girl's Gone Crazy" - 3:06
 "Don't Clone Me" - 2:16
 "I Don't Wanna Go Out With Her" - 2:40
 "Now I'm Alright" - 3:12
 "I'm Not Dangerous" - 3:24
 "Mutant Monster Beach Party" - 1:47

Personnel
 Mikey Huntington – Vocals, Bass, Moog, 
 Cliffy Huntington – Guitar, Vocals, Moog, mixing
 Mikee Huntington – Drums
 C. J. Huntington – Guitar
 Ryan Harris – moog

Production
Holt/Powell – producers
Nick Rotundo – engineer
Brandon D. Ebel – executive producer

References

The Huntingtons albums
2000 albums
Tooth & Nail Records albums